There are over a dozen lakes named Mud Lake within the U.S. state of Texas.

 Mud Lake, Anderson County, Texas.	
 Mud Lake, Bowie County, Texas.	
 Mud Lake, Calhoun County, Texas.	
 Mud Lake, Chambers County, Texas.	
 Mud Lake, Edwards County, Texas.	
 Mud Lake, Gregg County, Texas.	
 Mud Lake, Hardin County, Texas.	
 Mud Lake, Harris County, Texas.	
 Mud Lake, Henderson County, Texas.	
 Mud Lake, Jefferson County, Texas.	
 Mud Lake, Jefferson County, Texas.	
 Mud Lake, Jefferson County, Texas.	
 Mud Lake, Leon County, Texas.	
 Mud Lake, Liberty County, Texas.	
 Mud Lake, Madison County, Texas.	
 Mud Lake, Red River County, Texas.	
 Mud Lake, Walker County, Texas.

References
 USGS-U.S. Board on Geographic Names

Lakes of Texas